ThoughtSpot, Inc. is a technology company that produces business intelligence analytics search software.  The company is based in Mountain View, California, and was founded in 2012.

History
ThoughtSpot was founded in 2012 by a team of engineers who previously worked for Google, Oracle, and other Silicon Valley companies. The CEO and co-founder, Ajeet Singh, previously co-founded the company Nutanix. In late 2012, ThoughtSpot raised $10.7 million in Series A funding led by Lightspeed Venture Partners. In 2014, the company raised $30 million in Series B funding led by Khosla Ventures.

In January 2016, the company opened an office in London. In February 2016, ThoughtSpot announced that it had increased its revenue by 810 percent over the previous year. In May 2016, ThoughtSpot raised $50 million in Series C funding led by General Catalyst Partners. In October 2016, the company expanded its series C funding with an investment from Hewlett Packard Pathfinder. As part of the investment, ThoughtSpot entered the Pathfinder program and begin selling its software on Hewlett-Packard Enterprise infrastructure.

In May 2018, the company raised $145 million in Series D funding from Sapphire Ventures, Lightspeed Ventures, Khosla Ventures, General Catalyst and others to expand its AI based analytics platform. At the time, the company was valued at over $1 billion. In August, ThoughtSpot appointed former Nutanix President Sudheesh Nair as its new CEO.

In March 2019, ThoughtSpot relocated their headquarters from Palo Alto to Sunnyvale. In August 2019, the company raised $248 million in Series E funding from Silver Lake, Sapphire Ventures, and Geodesic Capital. 

By 2020, the company had $100 million in annual recurring revenue. In January 2020, the company hired several new executives for a potential initial public offering later that year. In November, the company announced a $100 million series F funding round that valued it at $4.2 billion.

On March 5, 2021 ThoughtSpot partnered with Indian information technology company Tech Mahindra. Also in March, the company announced it had raised another $20 million in venture capital investments from partner Snowflake Inc.'s venture capital arm Snowflake Ventures. Also in March, ThoughtSpot made its first acquisition by acquiring SQL-based analytics software startup SeekWell for $20 million. In May, ThoughtSpot acquired data integration company Diyotta. 

ThoughtSpot's clients include the companies Walmart and Apple.

Technology
ThoughtSpot allows for non-technical individuals to conduct a self-service data analysis search. The company introduced ThoughtSpot Monitor, a tool that monitors information for changing patterns or trends, in 2019 as part of its ThoughtSpot 6 software. ThoughtSpot's software comes with connectors called SpotApps that are each designed to integrate with different cloud services.

ThoughtSpot's software can analyze data from sources like Snowflake and Databricks, and integrates with the Google Cloud Platform and Amazon Web Services. It also offers an analytics software product designed for Google's data warehouse service, BigQuery. 

As of February 2021, ThoughtSpot was working on integrations with Microsoft Azure in a joint development agreement with Microsoft. 

ThoughtSpot also has a product for developing interactive self-service analytics tools.

Recognition
In 2016, ThoughtSpot was named a "Cool Vendor in Analytics" by Gartner. In 2017, the company announced that it was included on Gartner Magic Quadrant for Business Intelligence and Analytics Platforms report. Later, Gartner included ThoughtSpot in the leaders quadrant for Analytics and BI platforms for the years 2019 and 2020. ThoughtSpot was included in Red Herring's "Top 100 North American Companies" list.

References

American companies established in 2012
Software companies based in California
Software companies established in 2012
Business intelligence companies